A palimpsest is a manuscript page that has been scraped off and used again. 

Palimpsest may also refer to:

Books and journals
Palimpsest (novel), by Catherynne M. Valente, 2009
Palimpsest (novella), by Charles Stross, 2009
Palimpsest, a memoir by Gore Vidal, 1995
Palimpsest: Documents From a Korean Adoption, a graphic novel and memoir by Lisa Wool-Rim Sjöblom, 2019
Palimpsests: Literature in the Second Degree, a book by Gérard Genette, 1982
Palimpsest (journal), an academic journal about women of the African diaspora
The Palimpsest, now Iowa Heritage Illustrated, a journal of the State Historical Society of Iowa
Palimpsest Press, a Canadian book publishing company

Music
Palimpsest (album), a 2020 album by Protest the Hero
Palimpsest (Xenakis), a chamber music composition by Iannis Xenakis, 1979
Palimpsest I and Palimpsest II, orchestral compositions by George Benjamin

Science and technology
Palimpsest (geology), a geographical feature
Palimpsest (planetary astronomy), a type of crater on an icy moon of the outer Solar System
Palimpsest (software) or GNOME Disks, a Linux disk utility

See also
Palimpsestis or Tethea, a genus of moths